Papyrus is a thick paper-like material produced from the pith of the papyrus plant, Cyperus papyrus.

Papyrus may also refer to:
 Papyrus (comics), a Belgian comic book series
 Papyrus (company), stationery and greeting card retailer purchased in 2009 by American Greetings
 Papyrus (horse), a British Thoroughbred racehorse and sire
 Papyrus (typeface), a widely available typeface designed by Chris Costello

Computing 
 Papyrus (software), an Open Source UML 2 tool
 Papyrus Design Group, a computer game developer

Fictional characters
 Papyrus (character), a major character from the 2015 video game Undertale

See also
 List of ancient Egyptian papyri